Therèse Lundin (born August 2, 1970 in Uddevalla, Västra Götaland) is a former Swedish Olympic butterfly and freestyle swimmer. She competed in the 1992 Summer Olympics, where she finished 12th in the 100 m butterfly with a time of 1:01.38.

Clubs
Simavdelningen 1902

References
 sports-reference

1970 births
People from Uddevalla Municipality
Swedish female freestyle swimmers
Swedish female butterfly swimmers
Living people
Swimmers at the 1992 Summer Olympics
Olympic swimmers of Sweden
European Aquatics Championships medalists in swimming
Sportspeople from Västra Götaland County
20th-century Swedish women